Friedrich Wilhelm, Duke of Saxe-Meiningen (16 February 1679 in Ichtershausen – 10 March 1746 in Meiningen), was a duke of Saxe-Meiningen.

Life 
He was the fifth son of Bernhard I, Duke of Saxe-Meiningen and his first wife, Marie Hedwig of Hesse-Darmstadt.

When his father died in 1706, according to his will, he inherited the duchy of Saxe-Meiningen with his older full-brother, Ernst Ludwig I, and his younger half-brother, Anton Ulrich.

But, shortly after, Ernst Ludwig signed a contract between himself and his brothers, and they were compelled to leave full control of the duchy in his hands.

When Ernst Ludwig died (1724), Friedrich Wilhelm and Anton Ulrich took again the government of the duchy as guardians of his nephews until 1733.

After the death of his nephew, Karl Frederick (1743), he inherited the duchy of Saxe-Meiningen.

Friedrich Wilhelm never married and died after only three years of reigning. He was succeeded by his younger half-brother, Anton Ulrich.

Ancestors

References 
 Hannelore Schneider: Das Herzogtum Sachsen-Meiningen unter seinen ersten Herzögen. In: Verona Gerasch (Red.): Beiträge zum Kolloquium: 300 Jahre Schloss Elisabethenburg (= Südthüringer Forschungen. Bd. 27). Staatliche Museen, Meiningen 1994, S. 12–19.  
 Ludwig Hertel: Meiningische Geschichte von 1680 bis zur Gegenwart (= Schriften des Vereins für Sachsen-Meiningische Geschichte und Landeskunde. Heft 47,  = Neue Landeskunde des Herzogtums Sachsen-Meiningen. Heft 10). Gadow & Sohn, Hildburghausen 1904, Digitalisat.

1679 births
1746 deaths
House of Saxe-Meiningen
Dukes of Saxe-Meiningen
People from Ilm-Kreis
Princes of Saxe-Meiningen
Recipients of the Order of the White Eagle (Poland)